Viscount Malvern, of Rhodesia and of Bexley in the County of Kent, is a title in the Peerage of the United Kingdom. It was created on 18 March 1955 for the first Prime Minister of the Federation of Rhodesia and Nyasaland, Sir Godfrey Huggins. Since 1978, the title has been held by his grandson, the third Viscount, who succeeded his father.

Viscounts Malvern (1955)
Godfrey Martin Huggins, 1st Viscount Malvern (1883–1971)
John Godfrey Huggins, 2nd Viscount Malvern (1922–1978)
Ashley Kevin Godfrey Huggins, 3rd Viscount Malvern (b. 1949)

The heir presumptive and last male of the line is the present holder's uncle, the Hon. Martin James Huggins (b. 1928)

Arms

References

 Kidd, Charles, Williamson, David (editors). Debrett's Peerage and Baronetage (1990 edition). New York: St Martin's Press, 1990, 
 
 Line of succession of the Viscounts Malvern at Cracroft's Peerage.

External links

Viscountcies in the Peerage of the United Kingdom
Noble titles created in 1955